Galium glabrescens is a species of flowering plant in the coffee family known by the common name Castle Lake bedstraw. It is native to the mountains of far northern California and southern Oregon, including the Klamath Mountains.

Galium glabrescens is a perennial herb producing an erect stem up to about 30 centimeters tall from a woody base. The stems have widely spaced whorls of four oval-shaped leaves. The plant is dioecious, with individuals bearing either male or female flowers. Both types of flowers are yellowish to reddish and borne on small stalks emerging from the leaf axils.

Subspecies
Four subspecies are currently recognized (May 2014):

Galium glabrescens subsp. glabrescens - California
Galium glabrescens subsp. harticum Dempster & Ehrend. - Hart Mountain in Lake County
Galium glabrescens subsp. josephinense Dempster & Ehrend. - Josephine County
Galium glabrescens subsp. modocense Dempster & Ehrend. - Modoc County

References

External links
Jepson Manual Treatment
USDA Plants Profile
Photo gallery
CalPhotos

glabrescens
Flora of California
Flora of Oregon
Flora of North America
Plants described in 1956
Dioecious plants
Flora without expected TNC conservation status